Laurel Street Demo 2005 is the first full-length album by Tim Barry. It was originally recorded only as a demo, but was officially released in the United States on July 4, 2006.

Track listing
 Idle Idylist - 3:27
 Sorrow Floats - 2:36
 Gumshoe Andy - 2:37
 No News from North - 2:56
 Ain't Right Sure - 4:16
 Sagacity Gone - 3:01
 Church of Level Track - 3:31
 Carolina's RV - 2:55

References

2006 albums
Tim Barry albums
Demo albums